Philipp Hofmann is a German photographer. He has shot his pictures internationally and has been shown at many famous art fairs such as Art Miami as well as private exhibitions such as the Durst Organization in New York.

Early life and education

Hofmann is from Munich, Germany. He is an alumnus of the Technical University of Berlin and Harvard Business School, Cambridge.

Books

Hofmann’s first monograph, Digitaloil Edition One, was published in 2010. Famous collectors of Hofmann’s work include politicians and business magnates. Hofmann has subsequently released another book entitled Digitaloil Edition Two – Bon Voyage in 2015 which was published by Galerie Barbara von Stechow, Frankfurt in celebration of his solo show “Bon Voyage”.

Notable exhibitions and art shows
Hofmann has been associated with some well-known galleries around the world, including Galerie Barbara von Stechow Frankfurt; DeBuck Gallery New York/ Antwerp/ St.Paul de Vence; Galerie von Braunbehrens Stuttgart; Hamburg Kennedy Photographs New York who showcase his work at exhibitions and art fairs worldwide.

2015

ART NEW YORK – New York – De Buck Gallery – New York City

BON VOYAGE – Galerie Barbara von Stechow – Frankfurt

ART KARLSRUHE – Karlsruhe – Galerie Barbara von Stechow – Frankfurt

KUNST ZÜRICH – Zürich – Galerie Barbara von Stechow – Frankfurt

2014

ART KARLSRUHE – Karlsruhe – Galerie Barbara von Stechow – Frankfurt

ART FAIR – Köln – Galerie Barbara von Stechow – Frankfurt

KUNST ZÜRICH – Zürich – Galerie Barbara von Stechow – Frankfurt

2013

ART PALM BEACH – Palm Beach – De Buck Gallery – New York City

ART KARLSRUHE – Karlsruhe – Galerie Barbara von Stechow – Frankfurt

ART FAIR – Köln – Galerie Barbara von Stechow – Frankfurt

KUNST ZÜRICH – Zürich – Galerie Barbara von Stechow – Frankfurt

2012

SOLO SHOW – De Buck Gallery – New York City

ART SOUTHAMPTON – Southampton – De Buck Gallery – New York City

ART MIAMI – Miami – De Buck Gallery – New York City

ART KARLSRUHE – Karlsruhe – Galerie Barbara von Stechow – Frankfurt

ART FAIR – Köln – Galerie Barbara von Stechow – Frankfurt

KUNST ZÜRICH – Zürich – Galerie Barbara von Stechow – Frankfurt

2011

PHILIPP HOFMANN & OTHERS – Durst Corporation – De Buck Gallery – New York City

ART MIAMI – Miami – De Buck Gallery – New York City

SOLO SHOW – Galerie Barbara von Stechow – Frankfurt

PERSPEKTIVEN – DWS Investments – Galerie Barbara von Stechow – Frankfurt

ART KARLSRUHE – Karlsruhe – Galerie Barbara von Stechow – Frankfurt

ART FAIR – Köln – Galerie Barbara von Stechow – Frankfurt

SCOPE – New York – Galerie von Braunbehrens – München

2010

PHILIPP HOFMANN & OTHERS – Durst Corporation – De Buck Gallery – New York City

ART MIAMI – Miami – De Buck Gallery – New York City

SOLO SHOW – Galerie Barbara von Stechow – Frankfurt

PERSPEKTIVEN – DWS Investments – Galerie Barbara von Stechow – Frankfurt

ART KARLSRUHE – Karlsruhe – Galerie Barbara von Stechow – Frankfurt

ART FAIR – Köln – Galerie Barbara von Stechow – Frankfurt

SCOPE – New York – Galerie von Braunbehrens – München

2009

PALMBEACH3 – Palm Beach – Galerie Barbara von Stechow – Frankfurt

ART CHICAGO – Chicago – Galerie Barbara von Stechow – Frankfurt

2008

THE BEACH – Palm Beach – Galerie Barbara von Stechow – Frankfurt

ART MIAMI – Miami – Galerie Barbara von Stechow – Frankfurt

2007

SPARKLING SUMMER – Galerie Barbara von Stechow – Frankfurt

ART KARLSRUHE – Karlsruhe – Galerie Barbara von Stechow – Frankfurt

References

Bibliography

Digitaloil Edition One,  2010 

Digitaloil Edition Two, 2015

External links
Official Artist’s website
Digitaloil website
Jetset Photography website
Galerie von Stechow, Frankfurt
Gallery DeBuck, New York, St.Paul de Vence
Interview with Philipp Hofmann, De Buck Gallery November 2011
Galerie von Braunbehrens, Stuttgart

Living people
Harvard Business School alumni
Photographers from Munich
German expatriates in the United States
1976 births